Hibernia as a national personification representing Ireland appeared in numerous cartoons and drawings, especially in the nineteenth century.

As depicted in frequent cartoons in Punch, a magazine outspokenly hostile to Irish nationalism, Hibernia was shown as "Britannia's younger sister". She is an attractive, vulnerable girl. She is threatened by manifestations of Irish nationalism such as the Fenians or the Irish National Land League, often depicted as brutish, ape-like monsters. Unable to defend herself, Hibernia is depicted turning to the strong, armoured Britannia for defence. John Tenniel, now mainly remembered as the illustrator of Alice's Adventures in Wonderland, produced a number of such depictions of Hibernia.

At times, nationalist publications (such as the Land League and Parnell's United Ireland newspaper) did use the image of Hibernia. However, possibly because of the pro-union publications' adoption of the "helpless" image of Hibernia, nationalist publications would later use Erin and Kathleen Ni Houlihan as personifications of Irish nationhood. (Although Irish Nationalists did continue to use the terms "Hibernia" and "Hibernian" in other contexts, such as the Ancient Order of Hibernians). A statue, derived from an original by Edward Smyth and depicting a more confident Hibernia (with harp and spear), stands in the central position of three atop the General Post Office in Dublin. The statue appeared on a €2 commemorative coin in 2016 to mark the centenary of the 1916 Easter Rising.

References

19th century in Ireland
Personifications of Ireland
National personifications